Petrof is a Czech piano manufacturer founded in 1864. It is the leading European piano manufacturer, exporting to more than 60 countries.

History 
The company was founded in 1864 in Hradec Králové, Kingdom of Bohemia, by Antonín Petrof (d. 1915), who had apprenticed at Viennese companies such as Heintzman & Co., Friedrich Ehrbar and Schweighofer.

The owner Antonín Petrof was awarded an imperial and royal warrant of appointment to the court of Austria-Hungary. In 1924 the company was exporting its pianos to Europe, Japan, China, Australia and South America.

At the World Exhibition 1934 in Brussels, the Petrof instruments won the gold medal. At that time, approximately 400 people worked at their factory.

In 1948, Petrof was nationalized. The company was returned to the Petrof family in 1991. Petrof is currently led by two sisters from the fifth generation of the Petrof family and produces annually approximately 2,000 grand pianos and 12,000 upright pianos. Petrof is known for several innovations, such as ways to adjust the mechanics and particularly pressure point through magnetic systems.

Notable performers 
Petrof pianos have been used by many famous musicians, including among others: Ray Charles, Paul McCartney, Arturo Benedetti Michelangeli, Sviatoslav Richter, Count Basie, Richard Clayderman, Ennio Morricone and Mark Levinson.

Models

Grand pianos 
Current Grand Piano Models:

 Master Series
 P 284 Mistral: 284 cm (9'4")
 P 237 Monsoon: 237 cm (7'9")
 P 210 Pasat: 210 cm (6'10")
 Standard Series
 P 194 Storm: 194 cm (6'4")
 P 173 Breeze: 173 cm (5'8")
 P 159 Bora: 159 cm (5'3")

Upright pianos 
Current Upright Piano Models:

 Highest Series
 P 135 K1: 135 cm (53 1/8")
 P 131 M1: 131 cm (51 1/2")
 Higher Series
 P 125 G1: 125 cm (49 1/4")
 P 125 F1: 125 cm (49 1/4")
 P 125 K1: 125 cm (49 1/4")
 P 125 M1: 125 cm (49 1/4")
 P 122 N2: 122 cm (48")
 P 122 H1: 122 cm (48")
 Middle Series
 P 118 P1: 118 cm (46 1/2")
 P 118 M1: 118 cm (46 1/2")
 P 118 S1: 118 cm (46 1/2")

References

External links

 Official site
NAMM Oral History Interview Jan Petrof, past president (2012)
NAMM Oral History Interview Martin Kobza, instrument designer (2012)
NAMM Oral History Interview Zuzana Petrofová, president (2012)

Companies established in 1864
Piano manufacturing companies
Czech brands
Hradec Králové
Musical instrument manufacturing companies of the Czech Republic
Purveyors to the Imperial and Royal Court
Piano makers